Luc-Magloire Mbarga Atangana is a Cameroonian, born in 1954 in Nsazomo in Central Region. Holder of a DESS in Public Company Law obtained at Paris Dauphine University in 1987, he has been Minister of Commerce since 8 December 2004.

He is currently the spokesperson for the ACP countries (African, Caribbean and Pacific Ocean partners of the European Union) in the multilateral trade negotiations at the WTO (World Trade Organization).

Sources 
 Portail du gouvernement camerounais

1954 births
Living people
Government ministers of Cameroon
People from Centre Region (Cameroon)
Paris Dauphine University alumni
21st-century Cameroonian politicians